Carlos Alberto da Mota Pinto, GCC, GCIP, (Pombal, 25 July 1936 – Coimbra, 7 May 1985) was a Portuguese professor and politician.

Career
He graduated as a licentiate in law and doctorate in judicial sciences from the Faculty of Law of the University of Coimbra. He was also a professor at the Portuguese Catholic University and several foreign universities. Still today, his doctrine is very influential in the Portuguese legal community, mainly in what comes to civil law.

After the Carnation Revolution, on 25 April 1974, he helped in the foundation, jointly with Francisco Sá Carneiro, Francisco Pinto Balsemão, Joaquim Magalhães Mota, João Bosco Mota Amaral, Alberto João Jardim, António Barbosa de Melo and António Marques Mendes, of the Popular Democratic Party (PPD, today PSD).  He was elected Deputy to the Constituent Assembly and to the Assembly of the Republic (the name of the Assembly has its origins in a Mota Pinto's proposal) for PPD. Having distanced himself from Sá Carneiro, they would reconcile (at the time of Sá Carneiro's death they both supported the same presidential candidate, Soares Carneiro). He would again return to the party to serve as vice-president in 1983 and President in 1984 and 1985.

He was also Minister for Commerce and Tourism in the 1st Constitutional Government (1976–1977), Prime Minister of the 4th Constitutional Government between 1978 and 1979 when he was appointed by then President António Ramalho Eanes, Vice-Prime Minister and Minister for Defense of the 9th Constitutional Government (the Central-Bloc) from 1983 to 1985.

He died suddenly during 1985, in Coimbra, days before the Congress that gave the Presidency of the party to Aníbal Cavaco Silva.

Decorations
He was awarded with the Grand Crosses of the Order of Christ and the Order of Public Instruction.

Family
He married Maria Fernanda Cardoso Correia and had three sons: 
 Paulo Cardoso Correia da Mota Pinto (born Coimbra, 18 November 1966), a licentiate, doctorate, professor and renowned publicist of the Faculty of Law of the University of Coimbra
 Nuno Cardoso Correia da Mota Pinto (born Coimbra, 18 September 1970), is the alternate executive director at the World Bank in Washington, D.C., married to Ianara Pedrosa.
 Alexandre Cardoso Correia da Mota Pinto (born 1971), a Doctor in Law from the Faculty of Law of the European University Institute of Florence and a Lawyer at Uría Menendez-Proença de Carvalho, married to Joana Ferraz

References

1936 births
1985 deaths
People from Leiria District
Prime Ministers of Portugal
Members of the Assembly of the Republic (Portugal)
Government ministers of Portugal
Social Democratic Party (Portugal) politicians
University of Coimbra alumni